Margalitia camelliae is a Gram-positive, aerobic and rod-shaped bacterium from the genus of Margalitia which has been isolated from Pu'er tea. 1

References

Bacillaceae
Bacteria described in 2018